Johnathan Daniels (born 1945), known professionally as John Daniels, is an American former actor, songwriter, producer and club owner.

Biography
Born and raised in Gary, Indiana, Daniels attended Butler University.

Club ownership
Maverick's Flat used to be an Arthur Murray dancing school. It was outfitted with fluffy sofas and glass tile table tops in a late 1960s style. In 1966 The Temptations were there for the opening and it is said that their hit "Psychedelic Shack" is about the club. Football player and actor Jim Brown helped Daniels both financial backing and promotion.

Music
Daniels and his wife, Gwen Brisco, managed a Disco Soul group called The Love Machine. Another group that he was connected with was one that he put together. This group DeBlanc featured Linda Carriere and Nidra Beard. As well as touring the United States, the group toured Japan, Europe and Canada. Linda Carriere and Nidra Beard were later in the group Dynasty. Earlier in his career, Daniels had been a songwriter with Capitol records.

Credits
 Love Machine – The Love Machine - Philips – 63 70 725 - 1975 - (Executive Producer) 
 The Love Machine - Feel The Love - Victor – VIP-6405 - 1977 - (Executive Producer and Arrangement)

Film roles
Daniels had the lead role in The Candy Tangerine Man (1975) where he played a pimp-by-night and family-man-by-day. In Black Shampoo (1976), Daniels played Jonathan, a heterosexual promiscuous male hairdresser. Director Greydon Clark was inspired by the 1975 film Shampoo, in what was observed to be a common blaxploitation filmmaking technique of intentionally piggybacking on previous hit films starring predominantly white casts to create African American films. Daniels also had a role as Black in Bare Knuckles (1977), an action film that starred Robert Viharo, Sherry Jackson and Gloria Hendry.

Credits
Film
 Getting Over .... Mike Barnett (1981)
 Mean Dog Blues .... Yakima Jones (1978)
 Bare Knuckles .... Black (1977)
 Black Shampoo .... Mr. Jonathan (1976)
 The Candy Tangerine Man .... The Baron/Ron Lewis (1975)
 Tender Loving Care .... Jackie (1974)
 After the Ball Was Over (1969)

References

External links
 
 Bit of info by DayVee at BBC website
 
 

1945 births
Musicians from Gary, Indiana
20th-century American male actors
Living people
American male film actors
American male television actors
Male actors from Indiana
Writers from Gary, Indiana
Actors from Gary, Indiana